The Moscow International Business Center (MIBC), also known as Moscow-City, is an under-construction commercial development in Moscow, the capital of Russia. The project occupies an area of 60 hectares, and is located just east of the Third Ring Road at the western edge of the Presnensky District in the Central Administrative Okrug.

The complex is home to the highest numbers of skyscrapers in Europe. The Government of Moscow first conceived the project in 1992, as a mixed development of office, residential, retail and entertainment facilities. An estimated 250,000 – 300,000 people will be working in, living in, or visiting the complex at any given time. By 2016, twelve of the twenty-three planned facilities of the MIBC were already built; seven buildings were under construction; and four were in the design stage.



General description

History 
Before construction began, the area was a stone quarry and industrial zone, where most of the buildings were old factories that had been closed or abandoned. A public company, CITY, was created in 1992, to oversee the initial creation and development of Moscow City as well as its subsequent usage. CITY is also a general contractor and both landlord and lessor. Overall responsibility for the architectural planning and design of Moscow City belongs to the architectural studio No. 6, which is a part of the large Moscow practice Mosproject-2 named after Mikhail Vasilyevich Posokhin. This group, headed by Gennady Lvovich Sirota, who is officially the Chief Architect of Moskva-Citi, is in charge of overseeing the design of the complex as a whole and agreeing the details of individual projects. Each building lot has its own investor and architect. By 2014, the volume of investments in Moskva-City was approximately $12 billion.

Management 
Established in the spring of 1992, the PJSC City Company manages the creation and development of the MIBC. On 30 December 1994, the Government of Moscow authorized PJSC City to act as the managing company for the MIBC and to negotiate with third parties to help develop the MIBC. As of February 2014, the company was owned by the Solvers Group, led by Oleg Malis.

Buildings

List of building complexes 
Roof height, max height, and floors apply to the tallest building of the respective complex. Completion of construction applies to the building in each complex completed last.

Building gallery

Transport

Pedestrian 
The Bagration Bridge is a pedestrian bridge that goes over the Moskva River. It connects Tower 2000 and the rest of the MIBC complex.

Road 
Major thoroughfares that connect to the MIBC are the Third Ring Road, 3rd Magistralnaya street, and the Presnenskaya Embankment.

To correspond with the growing MIBC, new highways and interchanges were built to connect the MIBC with the main transport arteries of the city. These projects include the ten-lane Dorogomilovsky Bridge of the Third Ring Road over the Moskva River, the Third Ring Road interchange with Kutuzovsky Avenue, and the extension of the Presnenskaya Embankment. Existing roads were reconstructed and rearranged.

Rapid transit 
The MIBC is served by two metro lines, and three stations, and was for a time served by a further station and line.  Two of the stations are named Delovoy Tsentr (Russian for "business center").  Vystavochnaya (formerly known as Delovoy Tsentr) and Mezhdunarodnaya are on the Filyovskaya line, while Delovoy Tsentr is on the incomplete Bolshaya Koltsevaya line. The first Delovoy Tsentr was on Kalininsko-Solntsevskaya line since 2014, but was closed after four years operation, pending further development of the line.

The MIBC in addition is served by the Moscow Central Circle urban rail, with a station also named Delovoy Tsentr which opened in 2016. There are also plans to install a high-speed rail system between the MIBC and Sheremetyevo International Airport.

Accidents 

 On 2 April 2012, a fire occurred on the 67th floor of Federation Tower East/Vostok while it was under construction. 25 fire-fighting units and 4 helicopters of the Moscow Aviation Center responded and took four hours to extinguish the fire. Nobody was injured.
 On 25 January 2013, a fire occurred on the 24th floor of one of the skyscrapers at the OKO complex while it was under construction.
 On 12 January 2014, a fire occurred on the 15th floor of a 17-story building on Testovaya Street while it was under construction. The fire was extinguished and nobody was injured.
 On 9 July 2014, a fire occurred on Evolution Tower. The fire was extinguished and nobody was injured.
 On 18:45 on 31 August 2015, a fire occurred on the 33rd floor of Federation Tower East/Vostok due to the ignition of construction materials.
 On 13 April 2016, a worker fell to his death on the Naberezhnaya Tower, presumably from the hundredth floor.
 On 18 June 2017, builderer Sergey Delyashov climbed Eurasia/Steel Peak and was later rescued.

See also 
Other commercial districts in Russia:

 Lakhta Center
 Yekaterinburg City

Building comparisons:
 List of tallest buildings in Moscow
 List of tallest buildings in Russia
 List of tallest buildings in Europe

References

Notes

External links

Official IBC site
Official Federation Tower site
Citytowers Forum
My Moscow City

 
Financial districts in Russia
Central business districts in Russia
Skyscrapers in Moscow
Government of Moscow
Economy of Moscow
Mixed-use developments in Russia